Belinda Metz (born January 4, 1960) is a Canadian solo recording artist from the early to mid-1980s who has since gone into acting. She also has credits as a choreographer and songwriter.

Biography 

In 1982 Metz released an independent album, The Minx, on Quantum Records.  Signed to a recording contract in 1985 with Attic Records, she released a full-length album, Electric Splash, which contained her only hit single, "What About Me", and won her a "Most Promising Female Vocalist" award from the U-Knows, CFNY's listener's choice awards.

In 1985 Metz was severely injured in a car accident. Later she returned to the public eye, acting as a regular in such shows as Kung Fu: The Legend Continues and TekWar. Recently, she had a role as Irene the band manager in the  Disney Channel Original Series So Weird. She continues to act in television and movies, most recently Eight Below as well as doing voice over work for corporations like Telus. She continues to pursue an independent music career.

Filmography

References

External links
 Belinda Mitz – Jam Canoe Biography
 

1960 births
Living people
Actresses from Edmonton
Attic Records (Canada) artists
Canadian television actresses
Canadian women pop singers
Canadian voice actresses
Jewish Canadian actresses
Musicians from Edmonton
20th-century Canadian women singers
20th-century Canadian actresses
21st-century Canadian actresses